Atsuya (written: 敦也, 淳矢, 温允, 篤矢, or 渥哉) is a masculine Japanese given name. Notable people with the name include:

, Japanese baseball player and manager
, Japanese baseball player
, Japanese baseball player
, Japanese baseball player
, Japanese musician
, Japanese basketball player 
, Japanese sledge hockey player

Japanese masculine given names